Heikki A. Alikoski (1912, in Oulu – 28 December 1997, in Turku) was a Finnish astronomer and discoverer of minor planets.

From 1937 to 1956, he was an observatory assistant under Yrjö Väisälä at Turku Observatory, where he discovered 12 asteroids. Alikoski later helped establish the Turku Astronomical–Optical Institute.

The outer main-belt asteroid 1567 Alikoski, discovered by Yrjö Väisälä in 1941,  was named in his honour.

List of discovered minor planets

See also

References

External links 
 Everstar Observatory Staff

1912 births
1997 deaths
20th-century astronomers
Finnish astronomers
Discoverers of asteroids